Walter Peterhans (12 June 1897 – 12 April 1960) was a German photographer best known as a teacher and course leader of photography at the Bauhaus from 1929 until 1933, and at the Reimann School in Berlin under Hugo Häring.

In the 1930s Peterhans was a proponent of the Neues Sehen (New Vision) movement, taking close-up, still-life photographs of everyday objects and images that played with unusual angles and lighting.  At the Bauhaus, Peterhans' teaching involved using the theories of Kant, Plato and Pythagoras to show how beauty is constructed in the mind, and how it can be created in works of art.

Peterhans immigrated to Chicago in 1938 to teach the 'visual training' course to architecture students at Illinois Institute of Technology under the direction of Mies van der Rohe. There were ten units to this course, to be followed over four semesters. The course was so successful, it survived Peterhans by over thirty years.

In 1953 Peterhans was part of the founding core faculty at the Ulm School of Design (Hochschule für Gestaltung, 1953–1968) in Germany, which became a renowned, influential design school.

In the United States he was briefly married to American architect Gertrude Lempp Kerbis before he married Brigitte Schlaich, also an architect, in 1957.  He died of an unexpected heart attack at the house of his in-laws in Stetten im Remstal, near Stuttgart, and is buried there.

The Museum Folkwang in Essen owns the copyright for Peterhans.

References 

1897 births
1960 deaths
Photographers from Frankfurt
Academic staff of the Bauhaus
Illinois Institute of Technology faculty